Bajoga is a town and headquarters of Funakaye, and is also a local government area in the northern part of Gombe State, Nigeria. Bajoga is 9km south from Ashaka cement factory. JIBWIS Islamic Secondary School Bajoga is the first private secondary school to have been established in Bajoga.

Schools
 Government Day Secondary School Bajoga.
 Gombe State Polytechnic Bajoga.
 JIBWIS Islamic Secondary School Bajoga.
 Girl Child Initiative School.
 Gandu Primary School Bajoga
 Government Vocational Training Center Bajoga
 Al'majiri School.
 Sangaru Primary School, Bajoga
 Government Junior Secondary school Sangaru, Bajoga
 Federal Government Girls College.
 Government Day Secondary School Bajoga South

See also 
 Railway stations in Nigeria

References 

Towns in Nigeria